IIFA may refer to:

Independent Indoor Football Alliance, American indoor football league based in the state of Texas
International Indian Film Academy, organization for professionals in the Hindi language film industry
International Islamic Fiqh Academy, international Islamic institution for the advanced study of Islamic jurisprudence and law based in Jeddah